Le Fiamme di Zaporoze is an epic historical novel written in Italian about the Zaporozhian Cossacks at the time of Hetman Ivan Mazepa and Czar Peter the Great during the Great Northern War, by Mario Dimitrio Donadio and published in Italy by Giraldi Editore in 2008.

External links 
 https://web.archive.org/web/20110922200340/http://www.mfa.gov.ua/mfa/ua/publication/content/25622.htm

References 

 www.giraldieditore.it/Fiamme di Zaporoze
 www.mfa.gov.ua/Fiamme di Zaporoze (Ministry for Foreign Affairs of Ukraine)
 www.radiosvoboda.org/Історія козацтва в романі італійця

Italian historical novels
2008 Italian novels
Great Northern War
Cultural depictions of Peter the Great
Novels set in the 18th century